Rossz Csillag Alatt Született is the twelfth studio album by Canadian electronic music producer Venetian Snares, released on the Planet Mu label on 2005. Inspired by a visit to Hungary, the album title and all of the track names are in Hungarian;  translates to "Born Under A Bad Star", a Hungarian expression which means "cursed from birth". The album consists of classical strings and brass combined with breakbeats.

Overview
The concept of the album came when Aaron Funk imagined himself as a pigeon on Budapest's Királyi Palota (Royal Palace). Its third track, "Öngyilkos Vasárnap" is a cover of the song "Szomorú Vasárnap" ("Gloomy Sunday") by Hungarian composer Rezső Seress, which has been referred to as the Hungarian suicide song. According to urban legend, Seress's song has inspired the suicide of multiple people, including his fiancée. The song was reportedly banned in Hungary. It has also been covered by many artists. Billie Holiday's vocals are sampled in this track.

The album also samples various pieces of classical music:
 The first movement of Béla Bartók's fourth string quartet, in track two.
 The second of Igor Stravinsky's "3 Pieces for Clarinet", in track five.
 The first movement of Gustav Mahler's 3rd Symphony (trombone solo), in track five.
 Measures 121-128 (14), 134 (15) and 144 (16) of Bartók's first string quartet (third movement), in track five.
 Niccolò Paganini's 7th Caprice in A minor, in track five.
 The beginning of the solo part of Franz Waxman's Carmen Fantasie in track five.
 The first and third measure of the fourth movement of Bartók's sixth string quartet, in track six.
 Sir Edward Elgar's "Cello Concerto in E Minor, Op. 85", in track eight.
 The second movement of Sergei Prokofiev's Quintet in G Minor in track eight.
 The Siciliana of Fantasia No. 9 from Georg Philipp Telemann's Twelve Fantasias, in track ten.

While there were no official music videos released with the album, artist David O'Reilly produced an unofficial computer generated video for "", and Mason Shefa produced a film featuring "".

Critical reception

Alan Ranta of Tiny Mix Tapes praised  as Funk's "most accomplished album to date" and described it as being "of uncouth beauty that is at once sublime, timeless, cinematic, sporadic, and moving from start to finish." Sputnikmusic writer Nick Greer hailed it as an "absolutely amazing" release that "truly excels in how it shifts paradigms in unexpected ways". William Tilland of AllMusic called the album "typically uncompromising and unsettling, although it is certainly constructed with great technical skill and maintains an abrasive beauty throughout." Cameron MacDonald of Pitchfork was more reserved in his praise and felt that "Funk's percussive palate could have ventured beyond the standard-issued 'Amen' breakbeats", while concluding that "Rosszs totality still possesses nerves that can cast shadows that never dissipate away from the mind."

Tiny Mix Tapes ranked  the 25th best album of 2005 and the 31st best album of the 2000s. In 2014, Resident Advisor critic Hugh Taylor described it as "one of breakcore's most important albums". In 2017, Pitchfork placed it at number 25 on its list of "The 50 Best IDM Albums of All Time".

Track listing

CD release

2×12" release

References

Further reading
Britton, Eliott. "Born under a Bad Star: An Analysis of abstract loop-based composition through Aaron Funk's Szerencsétlen". eContact! 12.4 — Perspectives on the Electroacoustic Work / Perspectives sur l'œuvre électroacoustique (August 2010). Montréal: CEC.

External links
Official release page

2005 albums
Venetian Snares albums
Planet Mu albums